A supercomputer is a computer with a high level of performance as compared to a general-purpose computer.

Supercomputer may also refer to:

Fiction
 "Super Computer", an episode of the Adult Swim animated television series Aqua Teen Hunger Force
 Super Computer, a fictional TV sitcom in the universe of the TV show 30 Rock
 Supercomputer, a book by Edward Packard